Solnechnoye (Bataş) is a rural locality (a selo) in Khasavyurtovsky District, Republic of Dagestan, Russia. The population was 4,501 as of 2010. There are 42 streets.

Geography 
Solnechnoye is located 12 km northwest of Khasavyurt (the district's administrative centre) by road. Nuradilovo is the nearest rural locality.

References 

Rural localities in Khasavyurtovsky District